Gauchito may refer to:
The FIFA World Cup mascot of 1978: a boy wearing Argentina's kit, his hat (with the words ARGENTINA '78), neckerchief and whip are typical of gauchos
A reusable launch system under development